Karl Konrad "Carlo" Sutermeister (15 July 1847 - 12 December 1918) was a Swiss engineer and timber businessman, and co-founder of the Banco Popolare di Intra. In 1890 he constructed Italy's first hydropower plant with AC transmission in Cossogno.

References

Further reading
Vera Sutermeister Cassano. Carlo Sutermeister fra Intra e Val Grande. Verbania Intra: Alberti Libraio Editore, 1992.

External links
Approfondimento Ritratto di Carlo Sutermeister

1847 births
1918 deaths
Swiss engineers
Businesspeople in timber